The Lady in Black is a 1928 German silent film directed by Franz Osten and starring Liane Haid, Marcella Albani and Charles Lincoln.

The film's sets were built by the art directors Bruno Lutz and Franz Seemann.

Cast
 Liane Haid as Irena Wolkowa
 Marcella Albani as Prinzessin Nedelkoff aka Fr. Bennigsen
 Charles Lincoln as Julian Holt - Boxer
 Kurt Vespermann as Carl Toll, Redakteur
 Erich Kaiser-Titz as Lawyer Golwisch
 Albert Paulig as Privatdetektiv Olsen
 Gyula Szőreghy as Petroff
 Hermann Picha as Franz Kiekebusch
 John Mylong as Werner Bennigsen

References

Bibliography
 Parish, James Robert. Film Actors Guide. Scarecrow Press, 1977.

External links

1928 films
Films of the Weimar Republic
German silent feature films
Films directed by Franz Osten
German black-and-white films
1920s German films